John A. Lynch may refer to:

 John A. Lynch Sr. (1908–1978), member of New Jersey Senate and mayor of New Brunswick, New Jersey (1951–1955)
 John A. Lynch Jr. (born 1938), member of New Jersey Senate and mayor of New Brunswick, New Jersey (1979–1991)
 John A. Lynch (New York politician), American businessman and politician from New York
 John A. Lynch (ferryboat)

See also
John Lynch (disambiguation)